Wilfrid Charles Thorley (31 July 1878 in Southport, Lancashire – 28 January 1963 in Wirral, Cheshire) was an English poet and translator.

Thorley was the son of a well-to-do retired draper and magistrate, and his young wife. He was twice married, first to Katherine E Dunn in 1914, and after her death in 1925, second to Gertrude M Neville in 1937.

He was educated privately, then at the Liverpool Institute (and possibly the University of Liverpool) and Grenoble University.  However, he said that he learnt most while teaching English to foreign students in Sweden, Belgium, France and Italy, during the ten years preceding World War I.

His best-known poem is "Chant for Reapers", due to its inclusion in the Oxford Book of English Verse.

Publications 
 A Primer of English for Foreign Students, 1910
 Confessional, and other Poems, reprinted 1911
 An English Reader for Foreign Students, 1913
 Florentine Vignettes, Being Some Metrical Letters of the Late Vernon Arnold Slade, edited by Wilfrid Thorley, 1914 
 Paul Verlaine, 1914
 Fleurs-de-Lys:: A Book of French Poetry Freely Translated into English Verse, 1920
 Cloud-Cuckoo-Land: a Child's Book of Verses, 1923
 The Londoner's Chariot. (Poems about London Transport Hansom Cabs to Motor Buses), 1925
 A Bouquet from France: one hundred French poems with English translations in verse and brief notes, 1926
 Maypole Market: a Child's Book of Verses, 1927
 Cartwheels and Catkins: Verses for Girls and Boys, 1930
 A Year in England for Foreign Students, 1930
 The Happy Colt, and other verses, 1940
 Barleycomb Billy, and other rhymes, 1943
 The French Muse, 50 Examples with Biographical and Critical Notes, 1944

As Harley Quinn:
 A Caboodle of Beasts, 1945
 Quinn's quiz: Being rhymed riddles on a variety of subjects for young and old, 1957

References

 Who was Who

1878 births
1963 deaths
English translators
People from Southport
Writers from Lancashire
Alumni of the University of Liverpool
English male poets
English male non-fiction writers